There are two species of snake named  indistinct ground snake:
 Atractus esepe
 Atractus indistinctus